Liam Shephard (born 22 November 1994) is a Welsh professional footballer who plays as a right-back for League Two club Salford City.

Early life
Shephard grew up in Pentre, Rhondda Cynon Taf. He is son of former footballer Garry Shephard.

Club career
Shephard joined Swansea City from Cardiff City in the summer of 2011, and progressed through Swansea City's Academy. Shephard signed his first professional deal with Swansea at the start of the 2013–14 season. Shephard broke into the first-team squad in the first half of the 2014–15 season, and was included on the bench for four Premier League matches and two cup games. Shephard was rewarded for his progress with a new -year contract until June 2017.

On 17 January 2015, Shephard joined League One team Yeovil Town on a youth loan deal and made his professional debut three days later against Preston North End. Yeovil later extended the loan until the end of the season. Shephard went on to make 20 appearances for the Glovers and was awarded Young Player of the Year, as Yeovil were relegated to League Two.

Shephard made his first team debut for Swansea City in the FA Cup against Oxford United, on 10 January 2016, in a 3–2 third round defeat.

On 24 March 2016, Shephard returned to Yeovil Town on a month loan deal. Initially brought in as cover for fellow Swansea loanee Connor Roberts, Shephard started six matches all in a defensive midfield role as he helped Yeovil to avoid relegation.

On 1 July 2016, Shephard joined Yeovil Town for a third time on a six-month loan deal.

Upon his return from his loan spell with Yeovil, Shephard was released by Swansea at the end of the 2016–17 season.

On 10 July 2017, Shephard signed for League One club Peterborough United on a two-year contract.

On 28 June 2018, Shephard joined League Two club Forest Green Rovers for an undisclosed fee on a two-year contract. Shephard was released by Forest Green Rovers at the end of the 2019–20 season.

On 2 September 2020 Shephard joined Newport County on a one-year contract. He made his debut for Newport on 5 September 2020 in the 2-0 EFL Cup win against Swansea City. He scored his first goal for Newport on 19 September 2020 in the League Two 2–1 win against Barrow. Shephard played for Newport in the League Two playoff final at Wembley Stadium on 31 May 2021 which Newport lost to Morecambe, 1-0 after a 107th-minute penalty.

In June 2021 Shephard rejected a contract extension at Newport and signed a two-year contract at Salford City.

International career
Shephard was called up to Wales under-21 squad to face Bulgaria in March 2015. Later in the qualification campaign, Shephard made his debut in a 2–1 win over Armenia.

Style of play
Shephard is primarily a right-back but can also play at centre-back.

Career statistics

References

External links

1994 births
Living people
People from Pentre
Sportspeople from Rhondda Cynon Taf
Welsh footballers
Cardiff City F.C. players
Swansea City A.F.C. players
Yeovil Town F.C. players
Peterborough United F.C. players
Forest Green Rovers F.C. players
Newport County A.F.C. players
Salford City F.C. players
English Football League players
Association football defenders